The men's competition in the featherweight  (– 62 kg) division was staged on November 21, 2009.

Schedule

Medalists

Records

Results

References
Results 

- Mens 62 kg, 2009 World Weightlifting Championships